Port Meadow with Wolvercote Common and Green is a  biological Site of Special Scientific Interest in Oxford in Oxfordshire. It is a Nature Conservation Review site, Grade I, and part of Oxford Meadows Special Area of Conservation. The remains of Godstow Abbey, which is a Scheduled Monument, are in the north of the site.

This site consists of meadows in the floodplain of the River Thames. It is thought to have been grazed for over a thousand years and is a classic site for studying the effects of grazing on flora. There is a low diversity compared with neighbouring fields which are cut for hay, but 178 flowering plants have been recorded, including creeping marshwort, which is a Red Data Book species not found anywhere else in Britain.

References

 
Sites of Special Scientific Interest in Oxfordshire
Nature Conservation Review sites
Special Areas of Conservation in England